Apistogramma eremnopyge is a species of cichlid. It is only known from the Rio Pintuyacu, a tributary of the Rio Itaya near Iquitos, Peru. Most of the tributaries of this river system carry acid blackwater (pH ~ 5).

This is a small cichlid,  standard length which can be easily distinguished from its congeners by the presence of a prominent dark blotch on the lower part of the caudal peduncle in both sexes. The male is strikingly coloured with vivid blue and red patterning on the cheek and operculum and maroon, orange and blue colouring on the dorsal fin.

References

READY, J.S. & KULLANDER, S.O. Apistogramma eremnopyge, a new species of cichlid fish (Teleostei: Cichlidae) from Peru - Zootaxa 564: 1-10 (9 July 2004)
Römer, U., Hahn, I., Melgar, J., Soares, D.P. & Wöhler, M. (2004): Redescription of Apistogramma eremnopyge Ready & Kullander, 2004 - Das Aquarium 38 (12): 17-34 (1 December 2004)

eremnopyge
Freshwater fish of Peru
Taxa named by Sven O. Kullander
Fish described in 2004